Pyotr Piatrovich Prakapovich  was a Belarusian construction engineer, politician, statesman and a chairman of the National Bank of the Republic of Belarus, recipient of a number of state awards, including the title of honor Hero of Belarus (2006)

References

1942 births
Living people
Members of the Supreme Council of Belarus
Members of the Council of the Republic of Belarus
National Heroes of Belarus
Belarusian politicians